Khalifa al-Ghawil, sometimes transliterated as Khalifa al-Ghweil or Ghwell, is a Libyan politician. He was the prime minister of the General National Congress-led National Salvation Government in Tripoli.

Biography 
Prior to 31 March 2015, Al-Ghawil served as a deputy or aide to Omar al-Hassi, the prime minister of the disputed Tripoli-based government. After al-Hassi was fired as head of the GNC, Al-Ghawil was asked to serve as prime minister for one month, on a temporary basis.

On 1 December 2015, he formed a new cabinet.

The Prime Minister, of the United Nations supported Government of National Accord (GNA), Fayez al-Sarraj, arrived in Tripoli on 30 March 2016. The following day, it was reported that the GNA has taken control of the prime ministerial offices and that the GNC appointed Prime Minister Khalifa al-Ghawil had fled to Misrata. On 5 April 2016, the National Salvation Government, which had been led by Al-Ghawil, announced that it was disbanding and conceded power to the Presidential Council.

On 14 October 2016, the Presidential Guard revolted in Tripoli and proclaimed allegiance to GNC, took over the building of the High Council of State and announced the comeback of Ghawil cabinet Then, fightings occurred between Sarraj loyalists and Ghawil forces.

On 5 November 2016, he inaugurated the Power Station in Al Khums, a city controlled by forces loyal to GNS.

The fighting spread to other areas of Tripoli on 14 March. The Pro-GNA forces had recaptured the Guest Palace complex as well as the Rixos hotel. The channel was taken off-air while Khalifa Al-Ghawil was also reported by one of his aides to have been injured in the clashes. An agreement called for withdrawal of all armed groups from Tripoli in 30 days.

On 28 May, the 7th Brigade of the Presidential Guard (Al-Kani brigade) from Tarhuna, took over the Tripoli International Airport as a neutral side after Misratan militias loyal to Khalifa Ghwell withdrew from there following two days of heavy clashes. By the next day, the city of Tripoli was fully under control of pro-GNA forces, with all pro-GNC forces withdrawing as a result of clashes with pro-GNA forces.

References 

|-

Libyan Islamists
Living people
Prime Ministers of Libya
1964 births
University of Benghazi alumni